Lu'lu' (meaning "pearl") is used as a given male or female name. It may refer to:

 Lu'lu' al-Kabir (died 1008/9), minister and emir of Aleppo
 Mansur ibn Lu'lu', emir of Aleppo (1008–1016), son of prec.
 Lu'lu' al-Yaya (died 1117), atabeg of Aleppo
 Badr al-Din Lu'lu', ruler of Mosul (1211–1259)
 Husam ad-Din Lu'lu' (died 1200), Mamluk commander